Beraba pallida is a species of beetle in the family Cerambycidae.

References

Beraba
Beetles described in 2008